Durbar High School or Bhanu Higher Secondary School, opened in 1854 is the oldest modern school in Nepal located near Rani Pokhari, Kathmandu. The school was originally built to teach sons of Ranas exclusively but was opened to public citizens in 1901 by Dev Shumsher Jang Bahadur Rana. At first, Rana children were given education at Thapathali Durbar but later Jung Bahadur Rana moved it into its own building at Ranipokhari, Kathmandu. 

Some parts of the school were destroyed in the April 2015 Nepal earthquake. The school was rebuilt under the Chinese Aid.

History 
Durbar High School also known as Bhanu Secondary School is established during Rana regime. Established in 1854, Durbar High School is the country's first school. Located in Rani Pokhari, Kathmandu, it previously taught only members of the ruling family, but was opened to private citizens in 1901.

The school had to shift constantly from Thapathali Durbar to Charburja Durbar, Seto Durbar and Narayanhiti Durbar before being located in a small shed in Jamal. Finally in 1891, the then prime minister Bir Shumsher Rana had the present long building built on the west side of Rani Pokhari In 1900, Durbar School was turned into a public school. In 1967, its name was changed to Bhanu Madhyamik Vidyalaya.

The school lies next to Rani Pokhari built by king Pratap Malla in 1670. The school was originally an elementary English school. Feeling humiliated by not being able to communicate in English during his visit to Europe, Jung Bahadur Rana set up a school at his residence in 1853 with two teachers imported from England to teach children of the ruling families. The school was later shifted to Thapathali Durbar with an Englishman called Kenning as its first teacher. Named Durbar School (palace school), it marked the beginning of modern education in Nepal, but only the ruling Ranas and their sons could attend it. In 1876, the school began admitting children of high class government officers too.

Initially, the school as a feeder institution was affiliated with Calcutta University, and students had to travel to Kolkata for their high school entrance examination until an examination centre affiliated with Patna University was opened in Kathmandu in 1929. 

In 1933, the government established the School Leaving Certificate Examination Board and students did not have to travel to India for their exams. 

Some parts of the school were destroyed in the April 2015 Nepal earthquake. The school was rebuilt under the Chinese Aid. The four-storey school building with more than 40 classrooms is built in an area of 4,200 square metres.

Present day 
The building of Durbar High School which was reconstructed with support from the Government of China was handed over to the school management on 8th of September 2020.

As of 2020, around 350 Students are studying in Durbar High School. Currently, there are 17 teachers teaching in Durbar High School. Among them, 8 teachers are for secondary level. 3 for lower secondary level and 6 for primary level. At the present, there are only 7 staffs for the school administration.

The school is also planning to teach Robotics for Technical Education and establishing STEAM CLUB (Initiative of KMC Mayor) and focus will be given more towards the extra curricular activities. The school further plans to operate classes 11 and 12.

Gallery

See also 

 Education in Nepal
 Tri-Chandra College
 Padma Kanya Multiple Campus

References

Educational institutions established in 1854
Secondary schools in Nepal
Schools in Kathmandu
1854 establishments in Nepal
Durbar High School
Schools in Nepal